Organización Radial Olímpica (ORO) is a Colombian group of radio stations, which belongs to the wealthy and influential Char Abdalá family from Barranquilla. It started in 1969 with the purchase of Radio Regalo AM of Barranquilla, which would be renamed Radio Olímpica AM, after the homonymous chain of supermarkets and drugstores created by the Chars. Olímpica expanded first in AM in the Caribbean coast, later moving some of its stations to FM. In 1985 it would set their first station in Bogotá.

Its main network is Olímpica Estéreo, devoted to tropical music (salsa, merengue, vallenato). Other networks include Radio Tiempo, La Reina, MIX, Radio Mil, and La KY, these last two radio stations are located in Panamá. It also owns Emisora Atlántico, a Barranquilla station devoted to news and sports.

References

External links
Organización Radial Olímpica

Radio stations in Colombia
Mass media in Barranquilla